Svenska Spel ("Swedish Bets") is a state-owned company operating in the regulated gambling market in Sweden. For many years, state-owned Svenska Spel was the only company permitted to offer online gambling to people in Sweden, whether it be casino games, sports betting, or other types of games.

On January 1, 2019, Sweden brought in new laws that ended the state-run online gambling company’s monopoly and opened the market to private operators.

The Swedish gambling reforms attempt to strike a balance between giving players the freedom to choose and protecting them from bad actors. The company was founded in 1997 by the merger of the two state companies, Penninglotteriet ("The money lottery") and Tipstjänst ("Tip service"). The headquarters is located in Visby, Sweden.

It conducts sales through approximately 6,700 agents, 2,000 restaurants, pubs, and bingo halls as well as via the Internet. Through its subsidiary Casino Cosmopol, it operates three casinos in Stockholm, Gothenburg and Malmö. The surplus from the company’s operations is paid directly to the Public Treasury.

Starting from 2 November 2020, Erika Svanström became the new head of public affairs of Svenska Spel. Since April 2019 she has been an independent advisor on public affairs questions at the company.

References

External links  
 

Gambling companies of Sweden
Government-owned companies of Sweden